Vigra may refer to:

Places
Vigra, a former municipality in Møre og Romsdal county, Norway
Vigra (island), an island in Giske Municipality in Møre og Romsdal county, Norway
Ålesund Airport, Vigra in Giske Municipality, Norway 
Vigra transmitter, a transmitter facility for medium wave broadcasting in Giske, Norway
Vigra Church, a parish church in Giske Municipality in Møre og Romsdal county, Norway
Vigra Fixed Link, a tunnel network that connects the islands of Giske, Norway to the mainland of Norway.

Other
VIGRA, the abbreviation for "Vision with Generic Algorithms"
HNoMS Vigra, a Royal Norwegian Navy submarine chaser that saw action during World War II